Chiesa in Valmalenco is a comune (municipality) in the Province of Sondrio in the Italian region Lombardy, located about  northeast of Milan and about  north of Sondrio, on the border with Switzerland. The English for "Chiesa in Valmalenco" is "Church in Valmalenco": it is the most important village of the Valmalenco valley (a lateral valley of Valtellina).
The area near Chiesa in Valmalenco is famous for alpine skiing and the particular geology of the surrounding mountains.  

Chiesa in Valmalenco borders the following municipalities: Buglio in Monte, Caspoggio, Lanzada, Sils im Engadin/Segl (Switzerland), Stampa (Switzerland), Torre di Santa Maria, Val Masino.

Demographic evolution

Images
The following web sites collect free photos of Chiesa in Valmalenco and other municipalities of the Valtellina area and Province of Sondrio.

The town of Chiesa in Valmalenco:
 http://www.paesidivaltellina.it/galleria_chiesa/index.htm
The mountains of Valmalenco valley surrounding Chiesa in Valmalenco:
 https://web.archive.org/web/20150623135426/http://www.paesidivaltellina.it/index2.htm#valmalenco

References

External links
 www.comune.chiesainvalmalenco.so.it

Cities and towns in Lombardy